Drepanulatrix unicalcararia, the spurred wave, is a species of geometrid moth in the family Geometridae. It is found in North America.

The MONA or Hodges number for Drepanulatrix unicalcararia is 6682.

References

Further reading

External links

 

Caberini
Articles created by Qbugbot
Moths described in 1858